Centronyx is a genus of birds in the family Passerellidae, in the group known as American sparrows.

Species

References

 

 
Bird genera
American sparrows
Taxa named by Spencer Fullerton Baird